Zephyranthes martinezii (syn. Habranthus martinezii), is a species of flowering plant in the rain lily genus Zephyranthes, family Amaryllidaceae, native to northern Argentina. As its synonym Habranthus martinezii it has gained the Royal Horticultural Society's Award of Garden Merit.

References

martinezii
Endemic flora of Argentina
Flora of Northeast Argentina
Flora of Northwest Argentina
Plants described in 2019